Tonette is a Norwegian and Swedish given name in use in Sweden and Norway whose popularity peaked in the late 1960s. The name is a diminutive form of Antonetta and Antona as well as an alternate form of Tone, Tona and Torny. Notable people with this name include the following:

Tonette Lopez (died 2006), Filipino transgender activist, HIV/AIDS researcher and journalist
Tonette Walker (born 1955), American First Lady

See also

Tonetta (name)
Antonette
Tonette, a recorder-like musical instrument
Tionette Stoddard

Notes

Norwegian feminine given names
Swedish feminine given names